Željko Pavličević (born 26 March 1951) is a Croatian professional basketball coach and former player. He currently serves as the head coach for Eastern in
ASEAN Basketball League.

Early life
Pavličević began playing basketball in 1969 for the junior team of Lokomotiva in the city of Zagreb. He was studying at the Faculty of Chemical Technology at the basketball school.

Coaching career

Cibona 
Having passed all the categories in the club, (cadets, juniors etc.) in 1975, Pavličević became Mirko Novosel's assistant coach in the senior team of Cibona (until then WIT). In 1984–85 he was promoted to head coach, but only in domestic competitions (in EuroLeague led Mirko Novosel). 

In his first season as head coach with Cibona, won the Yugoslav Cup and the Yugoslav League (against Jugoplastika & Crvena zvezda ). As assistant coach he took part in the winning of the first title of European Champions Cup (the predecessor of today's EuroLeague) with Cibona in Athens Peace and Friendship Stadium against Real Madrid. The following season, (1985–86) as head coach of Cibona both in domestic and European competitions and with the roster weakened by the loss of Andro Knego in Cajamadrid, but refreshed with newcomer Dražen Petrović, won the Yugoslav Cup and became back to back European champion in Budapest against the Soviet champions Žalgiris. This match was marked by the participation of the two best European players, Petrović and the Lithuanian center Arvydas Sabonis.

Spain
After the three seasons with Cibona, Pavličević accepted his first international bid and coached the Spanish club OAR Ferrol, later becoming the club's sports director. During the 1989–90 season, he was hired by the Spanish first league club of Taugrés Vitoria.

Pop 84
In the summer of 1990, Pavličević accepted the offer from back-to-back European champions of Pop 84 the former Jugoplastika to lead the team following the exodus of Dino Rađa (il Messaggero Roma), Duško Ivanović (Girona) and Goran Sobin (Aris). Despite the changes, Pop 84 dominated and won all three trophies. Yugoslav Cup (finals with Cibona), the Yugoslav League (final playoffs against the rising power of Partizan) and third European title for the club and other personal title against FC Barcelona in Paris. He was awarded coach of the year. Players included Toni Kukoč, Zoran Savić, Velimir Perasović, Zoran Sretenović, Žan Tabak, Petar Naumoski and Luka Pavićević. Božidar Maljković led Barcelona, which is connected to Split by winning the previous two league titles in Europe.

Panathinaikos
For the 1991–92 season, Pavličević joined Panathinaikos and created the backbone of the club's future success. In 1992–93 with the arrival of Nikos Galis, Stojan Vranković, Arijan Komazec and Tiit Sokk the team won only the Greek Cup against Aris. The Championship final against arch-rival Olympiacos was controversial, given the club's decision not to play a third decisive game. The next season (1993–94) despite the coming of Alexander Volkov and  participation in the Final Four of Tel Aviv, he was fired in late 1993.

Decline
Pavličević was sports director of selection for the Basketball Association of Croatia from 1996 to 1998. At the invitation of Croatia Osiguranje during the 1996–97 season he coached the team again. In early 2003 Japanese Basketball Federation offered him a position coaching the Japanese national basketball team. It was a cycle of four years as a preparation for the World Basketball Championship in Japan in 2006. The national team progressed significantly, and held the largest seminar for coaches in the history of Japan with over 900 participants. In 2007–08 he coached Zagreb, with which he won the Krešimir Ćosić Cup, the first trophy in the club's history.

At the invitation of Shimane Susanoo Club Magica, member BJL (Japanese professional league) in summer 2010, he became head coach and remained for three seasons, reaching the playoffs each season. He coached Wakayama Trians NBL National basketball L. Japan in 2013–14.

Coaching record

|-
| style="text-align:left;"|Shimane Susanoo Magic
| style="text-align:left;"|2010–11
|50||24||26|||| style="text-align:center;"|6th in Western|||2||0||2||
| style="text-align:center;"|Lost in 1st round
|- 
| style="text-align:left;"|Shimane Susanoo Magic
| style="text-align:left;"|2011–12
|52||28||24|||| style="text-align:center;"|6th in Western|||3||1||2||
| style="text-align:center;"|Lost in 1st round
|-
| style="text-align:left;"|Shimane Susanoo Magic
| style="text-align:left;"|2012–13
|52||33||19|||| style="text-align:center;"|3rd in Western|||4||2||2||
| style="text-align:center;"|Lost in 2nd round
|-
| style="text-align:left;"|Wakayama Trians
| style="text-align:left;"|2013–14
|54||41||13|||| style="text-align:center;"|1st in Western|||6||2||4||
| style="text-align:center;"|Runners-up in NBL
|- 
|-
| style="text-align:left;"|Chiba Jets
| style="text-align:left;"|2015–16
|34||13||21|||| style="text-align:center;"|Fired|||-||-||-||
| style="text-align:center;"|-
|- 
|-
| style="text-align:left;"|Bambitious Nara
| style="text-align:left;"|2017–18
|34||7||27|||| style="text-align:center;"|Fired|||-||-||-||
| style="text-align:center;"|-
|-
|-
|-

Career achievements

Club competitions 
 FIBA European Champions Cup: 2 (with Cibona: 1985–86 and Pop 84: 1990–91)
 Yugoslav League: 2 (with Cibona: 1984–85 and Pop 84: 1990–91)
 Yugoslav Cup: 3 (with Cibona: 1984–85, 1985–86 and Pop 84: 1990–91)
 Greek Cup: 1 (with Panathinaikos: 1992–93)
 Croatian Cup: 1 (with Zagreb: 2007–08)

See also
 List of EuroLeague-winning head coaches

References

External links
 FIBA profile
Zeljko Pavlicevic making an impact with new coaching role in Libya

1951 births
Living people
Bambitious Nara coaches
Chiba Jets Funabashi coaches
Croatian basketball coaches
Croatian men's basketball players
EuroLeague-winning coaches
Japan national basketball team coaches
ASEAN Basketball League coaches
KK Cibona coaches
KK Split coaches
Panathinaikos B.C. coaches
Saski Baskonia coaches
Eastern Sports Club basketball coaches
Basketball players from Zagreb
Wakayama Trians coaches
Yugoslav basketball coaches
Yugoslav men's basketball players